The 2002–03 Eredivisie season was the 43rd season of the Eredivisie in basketball, the highest professional basketball league in the Netherlands.

EiffelTowers Nijmegen, led by head coach Marco van den Berg, won their first national title on 20 May.

Regular season

Playoffs

Bracket

Finals

References 

Dutch Basketball League seasons
1
Netherlands